Pieter Jan (Piet) Boukema (19 July 1933, Veur – 15 October 2007, Amstelveen)  was a Dutch jurist and politician. He was a member of the Provinciale Staten of North Holland from 1966 to 1970, of the Senate of the Netherlands from 1970 to 1976 and of the Raad van State from 1976 to 2000.

See also
List of Dutch politicians

References

1933 births
2007 deaths
Members of the Senate (Netherlands)
Members of the Council of State (Netherlands)
Members of the Provincial Council of North Holland
Anti-Revolutionary Party politicians
Dutch jurists
Dutch legal scholars
Protestant Church Christians from the Netherlands
Vrije Universiteit Amsterdam alumni
Academic staff of Vrije Universiteit Amsterdam
People from Leidschendam